Three Miles Out is a 1924 American silent drama film directed by Irvin Willat and starring Madge Kennedy, Harrison Ford, and Marc McDermott. The title of the film refers to the three-mile limit which formerly defined the territorial waters of the United States.

Plot
As described in a film magazine review, Molly Townsend is on the eve of her marriage to Luis Riccardi, a steamship man who secretly is a bootlegger. She follows John Locke, the man she really loves, on a steamship bound for Rio. He is thrown overboard, leaving her at the mercy of a crew full of bad men. She is nearly their victim when she is rescued by John and her mother. When the police come aboard, the leader of the band reveals the true character of Riccardi, leaving Molly and John happy together.

Cast

Preservation
A complete print of Three Miles Out is held by the Gosfilmofond archive in Moscow.

References

Bibliography
 Munden, Kenneth White. The American Film Institute Catalog of Motion Pictures Produced in the United States, Part 1. University of California Press, 1997.

External links

Lobby card at Getty Images.

1924 films
1924 drama films
Silent American drama films
Films directed by Irvin Willat
American silent feature films
1920s English-language films
American black-and-white films
Associated Exhibitors films
1920s American films